Gantch ("Call") was an Armenian language weekly newspaper published in Beirut, Lebanon in 1971–1983 and then again 1996–2006. It was an organ of the Lebanese Communist Party, and functioned as the Armenian-language edition of the main party organ an-Nidaa. Barouyr Yeretsian served as the editor of Gantch.

The newspaper was launched on February 20, 1971. Gantch covered political, social and cultural issues. It also had a sports section.

It provided extensive coverage of the Soviet Union and the Armenian SSR and propagated fraternity of Arab and Armenian peoples, anti-imperialism and anti-Zionism. The newspaper cooperated with TASS and Armenpress. 

Publication of the newspaper was interrupted in 1983. In its stead, the Communist Party began publishing Azkayin Mshagouyt («Ազգային Մշակույթ», "National Culture"). Gantch was relaunched in 1996, and was closed down in November 2006, two months after the death of Yeretsian.

See also
Joghovourti Tsayn

References

1971 establishments in Lebanon
2005 disestablishments in Lebanon
Armenian-language newspapers published in Lebanon
Communist newspapers
Defunct newspapers published in Lebanon
Newspapers established in 1971
Newspapers published in Beirut
Publications disestablished in 2005
Weekly newspapers published in Lebanon